Rod Laver defeated Andrés Gimeno in the final, 6–3, 6–4, 7–5 to win the men's singles tennis title at the 1969 Australian Open. It was the first step in an eventual Grand Slam for Laver. This was the first edition of the tournament to be open to professional players, marking a period in tennis history known as the Open Era.

William Bowrey was the defending champion, but lost in the quarterfinals to Ray Ruffels.

Seeds
The seeded players are listed below. Rod Laver is the champion; others show the round in which they were eliminated.

Draw

Final eight

Section 1

Section 2

Section 3

Section 4

References

External links

 Association of Tennis Professionals (ATP) – 1969 Australian Open Men's Singles draw
 1969 Australian Open – Men's draws and results at the International Tennis Federation

Men's Singles
Australian Open (tennis) by year – Men's singles